Credible minimum deterrence is the principle on which India's nuclear strategy is based.

It underlines no first use (NFU) with an assured second strike capability and falls under minimal deterrence, as opposed to mutually assured destruction. India's tentative nuclear doctrine was announced on August 17, 1999 by the secretary of the National Security Advisory Board, Brajesh Mishra.

Later, the draft was adopted with some modifications when the Nuclear Command Authority was announced on January 4, 2003. A significant modification was the dilution of the NFU principle to include nuclear retaliation to attacks by biological and chemical weapons.

See also 
Minimal deterrence

References 

Credible Minimum Deterrence
Nuclear weapons programme of India
Vajpayee administration
2003 in India